The 2000–01 Iowa State Cyclones men's basketball team represented Iowa State University during the 2000–01 NCAA Division I men's basketball season. The Cyclones were coached by Larry Eustachy, who was in his 3rd season. They played their home games at Hilton Coliseum in Ames, Iowa and competed in the Big 12 Conference.

They finished the season 25–6, 13–3 in Big 12 play to finish in first place.  They lost to Baylor in the quarterfinals of the Big 12 Conference tournament.  They received an at-large bid as a No. 2 seed to the NCAA tournament, where they were upset by 15th-seeded Hampton.

Previous season

They finished the season 32–5, 14–2 in Big 12 play to finish in first place.  They defeated Baylor, Oklahoma State, and Oklahoma to become champions of the Big 12 Conference tournament and earn an automatic bid to the NCAA tournament.  This was their first regular season and conference tournament since joining the Big 12.  In the NCAA Tournament they defeated Central Connecticut State, Auburn, and UCLA to advance to the Elite Eight where they lost to Michigan State.

The Cyclones saw individual success with Marcus Fizer being named a consensus First Team All-American and Big 12 Player of the Year and Larry Eustachy being named AP Coach of the Year.

Incoming players

Roster

Schedule and results

|-
!colspan=12 style=""|Exhibition

|-

|-
!colspan=12 style=""|Regular Season

|-

|-

|-

|-

|-

|-

|-

|-

|-

|-

|-

|-

|-

|-

|-

|-

|-

|-

|-

|-

|-

|-

|-

|-

|-

|-

|-

|-

|-
!colspan=12 style=""|Big 12 Tournament

|-
!colspan=12 style=""|NCAA Tournament

|-

Rankings

*AP does not release post-NCAA Tournament rankings^Coaches did not release a week 2 poll

Awards and honors

All-American
Jamaal Tinsley (Consensus Second Team)

Big 12 Player of the Year

Jamaal Tinsley

Big 12 Freshman of the Year

Jake Sullivan

Big 12 Coach of the Year

Larry Eustacy

All-Conference Selections
Jamaal Tinsley (1st Team)
Kantrail Horton (2nd Team)
Martin Rancik (3rd Team)
Paul Shirley (Honorable Mention)

Academic All American

Paul Shirley (Second Team)

 Academic All-Big 12 First Team

Paul Shirley

Big 12 Player of the Week

Kantrail Horton (January 8)
Jamaal Tinsley (January 22)

Big 12 Rookie of the Week

Jake Sullivan

Ralph A. Olsen Award

Jamaal Tinsley

References

Iowa State Cyclones men's basketball seasons
Iowa State
Iowa State
Iowa State Cyc
Iowa State Cyc